Akaroa is a rural locality in the local government area (LGA) of Break O'Day in the North-east LGA region of Tasmania. The 2021 census recorded a population of 130 for Akaroa.

History 
Akaroa was gazetted as a locality in 1975. The name comes from a property that was so named in 1946 by a settler who had lived for some time in Akaroa in New Zealand. It is believed to be a Māori word for “long harbour” or “peaceful waters”.

Geography
The waters of the Tasman Sea and Georges Bay form all boundaries of the locality except the southern.

Road infrastructure 
Route C851 (St Helens Point Road) enters from the south and runs through to the north, where it ends.

References

Towns in Tasmania
Localities of Break O'Day Council